Dimitrios Theodoridis (born 8 August 2002) is a Greek professional footballer who plays as a striker for Gamma Ethniki club Makedonikos.

References

2002 births
Living people
Greek footballers
Super League Greece 2 players
Panserraikos F.C. players
Association football forwards
Footballers from Thessaloniki
Olympiacos F.C. players
PAOK FC players
Asteras Tripolis F.C. players
Makedonikos F.C. players